USS Kineo may refer to the following ships of the United States Navy:

 , an ironclad gunboat launched 9 October 1861 and sold 9 October 1866
 , renamed Montcalm on 24 February 1919

United States Navy ship names